Nukâka Coster-Waldau (née Sascha Nukâka Motzfeldt; born 23 February 1971), better known professionally as Nukâka, is a Greenlandic singer, actress, and a former Miss Greenland. She is married to Danish actor Nikolaj Coster-Waldau and has two daughters with him.

The Greenlandic actress of Inuit, German and Norwegian descent was born in Uummannaq, Greenland, Kingdom of Denmark. She is the daughter of Vivi and Josef Motzfeldt, a Greenlandic politician.

International pageants
Coster-Waldau participated in the 1990 Miss Universe Pageant, finishing in 19th place in the preliminaries, giving Greenland its highest placement at Miss Universe.

Filmography

Film

Television

Theatre

References

External links
 

1971 births
20th-century Danish actresses
20th-century Danish women singers
21st-century Danish actresses
21st-century Danish women singers
Greenlandic actresses
Greenlandic beauty pageant winners
Greenlandic women singers
Greenlandic Inuit people
Greenlandic people of German descent
Greenlandic people of Norwegian descent
Inuit actresses
Inuit musicians
Living people
Miss Universe 1990 contestants
People from Uummannaq